is a Japanese manga series by Eri Ejima. It has been serialized in Media Factory's seinen manga magazine Monthly Comic Flapper since January 2020 and has been collected in five tankōbon volumes. The manga is licensed in North America by Seven Seas Entertainment. A live-action television drama adaptation is set to premiere in May 2023. An anime adaptation has also been announced.

Characters

Media

Manga
The manga series is written and illustrated by Eri Ejima and has been serialized in Media Factory's seinen manga magazine Monthly Comic Flapper since January 2020. Five tankōbon volumes were released as of October 2022. Seven Seas Entertainment licensed the manga for a North American release.

Drama
A live-action television drama adaptation was announced on October 22, 2022. It is directed by Ryoma Ouchida and written by Anna Kawahara. It is set to premiere on the Lemino streaming service on May 19, 2023 and run for eight episodes.

Anime
An anime adaptation was announced on January 20, 2021.

References

External links

2023 Japanese television series debuts
Anime series based on manga
Comedy-drama anime and manga
Media Factory manga
School life in anime and manga
Seinen manga
Seven Seas Entertainment titles